Kükenthal is a German surname. Notable people with the surname include:

Willy Kükenthal (1861–1922), German zoologist
Georg Kükenthal (1864–1955), German pastor and botanist, brother of Willy
Fitz Kükenthal (1893–1974), German illustrator

German-language surnames